The A.R. Davis Memorial Lecture is held annually in commemoration of A.R. Davis, the Professor of Oriental Studies at the University of Sydney and a key figure in post-war Asian Studies in Australia. It is organised by the Australian Society for Asian Humanities (formerly the Oriental Society of Australia) and published in the Journal of the Society for Asian Humanities (formerly the Journal of the Oriental Society of Australia).

Speakers and topics
Speakers and topics have included:

1995, S.N. Mukherjee, “Orientalism and History” 
1998, Adrian Snodgrass, “Language, Rules and Ritual: Semantics and the Indo-Japanese Fire Ceremony”  
2000, Roland Fletcher, “Seeing Angkor, New Views of an Old City.” 
2001, Joseph Jordens, “Gandhi’s Non-Violence Revisited.” 
2002, Michael G. Carter, “‘The Scholar as Dragoman”  
2004, Alison Broinowski, “The Outbreak of Occidentalism” The outbreak of Occidentalism: A. R. Davis Memorial Lecture, 2004  
2005, Leith Morton, “Shamans Make History in Okinawa: A reading of Oshiro Tatsuhiro’s Novel Noro (Mantic Woman, 1985)
2006, Frits Staal, “Secrets behind Walls” 
2007, Colin Mackerras, “China's Islamic Minorities--Contemporary Perspectives” A R Davis Memorial Lecture, 2007, China's Islamic Minorities--Contemporary Perspectives 
2009, Neville Meaney, “The problem of nationalism and race: Australia and Japan in World War I and World War II”  
2010, Michael Walsh, "Voices from the north: linguistic connections between Asia and Aboriginal Australia" 
2011, Bonnie McDougall, “Ambiguities of power: The social space of translation relationships” 
2012, Jocelyn Chey, “Laughing down the ages: A brief history of humour in China”  
2013, Jamila Hussain, “Reflections on Islamic thought over the ages” 
2015, Carol Hayes, “Women writing women: 'A woman's place' in modern Japanese women's poetry”  
2016, Sekhar Bandyopadhyay, “Caste, nation and modernity: Indian nationalism's unresolved Dilemma” 
2017, Jon von Kowallis,  “Takeuchi's Lu Xun / China's Takeuchi” 
2018, Mabel Lee,  “On the creative aesthetics of nobel laureate Gao Xingjian” 
2019, Adrian Vickers,  “From Orientalism to Inter-Asia Referencing” 
2020, Devleena Ghosh,  “The bones of our mothers”: Coal, climate and resistance in a Chhattisgarh District” 
2021, Vera Mackie, "Asia in Australia: History on the Streets"
2022, Barbara Hendrischke, "Daoist Plans for a Millennium of Great Peace"

References

Asian studies
University of Sydney
Lecture series
Annual events in Australia